The far-left Direct Action (AD) terror group detonated a bomb at the headquarters of the Brigade de répression du banditisme (BRB) police division in Paris, France, on 9 July 1986. It killed the division's chief inspector, Marcel Basdevant, and injured 22 other officers. The group claimed responsibility two days later.

The bomb is thought to have contained 10 kg of explosives and was planted in a restroom on the third floor. It caused major damage to the building, which was still new. Maxime Frérot, a member of Action Directe's Lyon branch, was arrested in 1989 for the attack. He was eventually sentenced to serve 23 years in prison.

On the same day, the West German Red Army Faction (which was allied with Direct Action) assassinated Karl Heinz Beckurts in Bavaria.

See also
January 2016 Paris police station attack
Paris police headquarters stabbing

References

1986 murders in France
Attacks on buildings and structures in 1986
1986 police station
Attacks on police stations in the 1980s
Building bombings in France
Cold War history of France
Communism in France
Communist terrorist incidents in Europe
Improvised explosive device bombings in 1986
1986 police station attack
July 1986 crimes
July 1986 events in Europe
Murder in Paris
Terrorist incidents in France in 1986
1980s murders in Paris